In Greek mythology, Priam, the mythical king of Troy during the Trojan War, supposedly had 18 daughters and 68 sons. Priam had several wives, the primary one Hecuba, daughter of Dymas or Cisseus, and several concubines, who bore his children. There is no exhaustive list, but many of them are mentioned in various Greek myths. Almost all of Priam's children were slain by the Greeks in the course of the war, or shortly after.

The three main sources for the names of the children of Priam are: Homer's Iliad, where a number of his sons are briefly mentioned among the defenders of Troy; and two lists in the Bibliotheca and Hyginus' Fabulae. Virgil also mentions some of Priam's sons and daughters in the Aeneid. Some of the daughters taken captive at the end of the war are mentioned by Pausanias, who in his turn refers to paintings by Polygnotus in the Lesche of Delphi.

These are summarized by author below.

Sons

Daughters 

Pausanias enlists several more Trojan captive women, who may or may not be daughters of Priam: Clymene, Xenodice, Deinome, Metioche, Peisis, Cleodice. He remarks, however, that of these only Clymene and Deinome were mentioned in literary sources known to him, and that the rest of the names could have been invented by Polygnotus.

Footnotes
Aeneas – who later led the survivors of Troy – was not a son of Priam, but his father Anchises was Priam's first cousin, making Aeneas Priam's first cousin once removed. Aeneas did, however, marry Priam's daughter Creusa, making him a son-in-law of Priam. Ascanius, the son of Aeneas and Creusa, was himself the ancestor of Romulus and Remus.
 According to Homer:
 Lycaon is the son of Laothoe.
 Gorgythion is the son of Castianeira.
 According to Apollodorus: 
Aesacus's mother is Arisbe, daughter of Merops.
Hecuba, daughter of Dymas is the mother of Hector, Paris, Deiphobus, Helenus, Pammon, Polites, Antiphus, Hipponous, Polydorus, Troilus (Troilus may be the son of Apollo), Laodice, Polyxena, Cassandra and Creusa.
In Mozart's opera, Idomeneo, Ilia is mentioned as another daughter of Priam.

Notes

References 

 Apollodorus, The Library with an English Translation by Sir James George Frazer, F.B.A., F.R.S. in 2 Volumes, Cambridge, MA, Harvard University Press; London, William Heinemann Ltd. 1921. ISBN 0-674-99135-4. Online version at the Perseus Digital Library. Greek text available from the same website.
Gaius Julius Hyginus, Fabulae from The Myths of Hyginus translated and edited by Mary Grant. University of Kansas Publications in Humanistic Studies. Online version at the Topos Text Project.
 Homer, The Iliad with an English Translation by A.T. Murray, Ph.D. in two volumes. Cambridge, MA., Harvard University Press; London, William Heinemann, Ltd. 1924. . Online version at the Perseus Digital Library.
Homer, Homeri Opera in five volumes. Oxford, Oxford University Press. 1920. . Greek text available at the Perseus Digital Library.
 Pausanias, Description of Greece with an English Translation by W.H.S. Jones, Litt.D., and H.A. Ormerod, M.A., in 4 Volumes. Cambridge, MA, Harvard University Press; London, William Heinemann Ltd. 1918. . Online version at the Perseus Digital Library
Pausanias, Graeciae Descriptio. 3 vols. Leipzig, Teubner. 1903.  Greek text available at the Perseus Digital Library.
 Publius Vergilius Maro, Aeneid. Theodore C. Williams. trans. Boston. Houghton Mifflin Co. 1910. Online version at the Perseus Digital Library.
 Publius Vergilius Maro, Bucolics, Aeneid, and Georgics. J. B. Greenough. Boston. Ginn & Co. 1900. Latin text available at the Perseus Digital Library.

Priam
Princes in Greek mythology
Princesses in Greek mythology

children of Priam